Ridinger is a surname. Notable people with the surname include:

 Johann Elias Ridinger (1698–1767), German painter, engraver, draughtsman, and publisher
 Mary Lou Ridinger (born 1945), American archaeologist
 Tim Ridinger (born 1956), American politician